This is the Bloodshot Records discography, albums released on the Bloodshot Records label from 1994 until the present (as of 2014), ordered by catalog number.

While the record label started out releasing compilations of local Chicago area bands, they soon began to release albums for specific bands.

Discography

Main catalog 

 BS100. Waco Brothers: The Harder They Come; Volebeats: Maggot Brain; Neko Case: Make Your Bed (from Murder Ballads 7"); Neko Case: Rated X (with the Sadies) (from the Loretta Lynn 7"); Kelly Hogan: Hanky Panky Woman (also from the Loretta Lynn 7"); Andre Williams: 2 tracks including Jet Black Daddy, Lily White Mama; The Meat Purveyors: The Madonna Trilogy 7"; Rex Hobart: Every Rose Has Its Thorn (Poison) b/w Wasted Days and Wasted Nights (Freddie Fender) (from Hard Luck Favorites 7"); Jon Langford: Nashville Radio from Gravestone EP; previously unreleased tracks including things by Kelly; a collection of a lot of out of print 7" singles and some unreleased tracks

Bloodshot Distribution

Bloodshot Revival

Misc

References 

Discographies of American record labels